Chambardia wahlbergi is a species of bivalve belonging to the family Iridinidae.

The species is found in Africa.

References

Unionida
Bivalves of Africa
Bivalves described in 1848